Queensland Premier Cricket is the top cricket competition played in Queensland, Australia. The competition was founded under the name Brisbane Electoral Cricket in 1897 and eventually came to be known as Brisbane Grade Cricket, but has since expanded to take in teams from Gold Coast, Sunshine Coast, and Ipswich. 

As of the 2019/20 season there were six grades in the Two-Day Bulls Masters competition. In addition to the two-day Grade competition there is also a One-Day competition for the John McKnoulty Cup and a T20 competition for the Tom Veivers Trophy. There is also a women's One-Day competition for the Katherine Raymont Shield contested by eight sides as of the 2020/21 season, and a women's T20 competition under Queensland Premier Cricket.

Western Suburbs are the reigning First Grade premiers, and Gold Coast are the reigning premiers in both the One Day and T20 competitions.

History

Early years: 1897 - 1915
The 1894-95 Queensland senior cricket season resulted in great dissatisfaction among cricketers and the public due to poor management of fixtures because more prominent clubs would monopolize cricket grounds and not allow smaller clubs to play regularly throughout the season. As a result of this dissatisfaction in July 1895 a Queensland Cricket Association (Q.C.A.) meeting was held at which it was proposed that electorate cricket be established, which would mean disbanding the various clubs playing senior cricket in Queensland and replacing them with clubs organised by players residing within electorates. The proposal was greeted with enthusiasm, as club cricket was seen as old fashioned, with electorate cricket being a superior way of fostering rivalry and generating local interest in the sport, although an obstacle was securing cricket grounds in each electorate to accommodate a club. 

In April 1897 the National Cricket Union held a committee to submit proposals for an electorate cricket competition to be established in Brisbane in collaboration with the Q.C.A. for the 1897-98 season. In May the Q.C.A. held a meeting to formally discuss an electorate competition and appoint a committee to determine electorate boundaries and residential qualifications, and after discussion the decision to form an electoral competition was carried unanimously. In July 1897 the Q.C.A. decided to amalgamate with the National Cricket Union and rescinded its constitution, by-laws, and other rules and regulations, drafting new ones in keeping with electoral cricket with amendments suggests by the National body, and began planning a campaign to form the electorate clubs. In August the National Cricket Union pulled out of the amalgamation at the last minute, however the Q.C.A. pushed on forming subcommittees for each electorate to pursue forming clubs.

In October 1897 the inaugural Brisbane electorate cricket season began with the following clubs competing: North Brisbane, South Brisbane, Fortitude Valley, Toombul, Toowong, and Woolloongabba. Enoggera also formed a side but were unable to participate in the first season as they formed after fixtures had been scheduled, but the Queensland Cricket Association scheduled non-competition matches for the club to play. The season was regarded as disappointing, with the standard of cricket being poor and attendance being low, although a large amount of rain affected games was cited as a potential reason for low engagement.

In the 1898/99 season a Nundah club joined the competition and a Grammar School side began competing in the B Grade competition. Enoggera was unable to join the competition in 1898/99 but did finally compete in the 1899/1900 season, and in the 1900/01 season a Bundamba club joined the competition. By the 1901/02 season the Enoggera Club had become a general sports club and did not compete in the competition, and Nundah had merged with Toombul.

In 1913 the Queensland Cricket Association reconstituted the competition redrawing the electorate club boundaries to accommodate the following clubs: North Brisbane, South Brisbane, Woolloongabba, Toowong, Valley, Toombul, Nundah, and University. In 1915 the Q.C.A. suspended the competition due to the First World War, although in what would have been the 1916-17 season the Association secretary did schedule a handful of friendly matches between sides.

Recent events
Due to the COVID-19 pandemic the competition was suspended in 2020 however in September 2020 it became the first Australian state cricket competition to begin the 2020/21 season under Cricket Australia's Return to Play guidelines, which stipulated that the ball must be cleaned with a disinfectant wipe every forty minutes, that saliva could not be used to shine the ball, and that umpires could not hold bowlers hats during overs. In January 2021 Greater Brisbane entered a three-day lockdown due to the virus and accordingly the competition was suspended for one week and Queensland Cricket announced it would "continue to monitor the situation closely."

Women's cricket: 1997 to present
The Queensland Women's Premier Grade One-Day competition for the Katherine Raymont Shield was first held in the 1997/98 season. A women's second-grade One-Day competition for the Jodie Fields Shield was established in 2001/02 and a T20 competition was established in 2009/10. Clubs with women's first-grade sides competing as of 2017 were Western Suburbs, University of Queensland, Valley, Gold Coast, and Sandgate-Redcliffe.

Queensland women's cricket has expanded in recent years with Ipswich-Logan joining the first-grade competition in 2018/19, Wynnum-Manly and Redlands joining with a combined side in 2019/20, Sunshine Coast joining in 2020/21, and South Brisbane aiming to field a women's side to join in the 2022/23 season as of 2021.

Current teams

Defunct teams

Records

Batting records

Highest score

Most runs in a season

Highest season average

Bowling records

Best bowling

Most wickets in a season

Best season bowling average

Premierships

See also

References

External links

Sport in Brisbane
Cricket in Queensland
Grade cricket competitions in Australia
Recurring sporting events established in 1897
1897 establishments in Australia
Sports leagues established in 1897